Asteras is a Greek word meaning star. See also:

Ethnikos Asteras F.C.
Asteras Tripolis F.C.
Agrotikos Asteras F.C.
Kyanos Asteras Vari F.C.
Asteras Amaliada F.C.
Nafpaktiakos Asteras F.C.
Asteras Magoula F.C.
Neos Asteras Rethymno F.C.
Asteras Exarchia